German submarine U-777 was a German Type VIIC U-boat built in World War II, launched on 25 March 1944, and commissioned on 9 May, by its sole commander, Oberleutnant zur See Günter Ruperti.

Design
German Type VIIC submarines were preceded by the shorter Type VIIB submarines. U-777 had a displacement of  when at the surface and  while submerged. She had two shafts and two  propellers.

U-777 was fitted with five  torpedo tubes (four fitted at the bow and one at the stern), fourteen torpedoes, one  SK C/35 naval gun, (220 rounds), one  Flak M42 and two twin  C/30 anti-aircraft guns. The boat had a complement of between forty-four and sixty.

It underwent training with the 31st U-boat Flotilla, but did not participate in any patrols during its five-month career of active service. It was destroyed at 20:02 hours on the night of 15/16 October 1944, during a British air raid on Wilhelmshaven, Germany, at position . One crewman was killed.

Other notes
Despite the fact that many other U-boats lost men due to accident, disease and various other causes, the crew of U-777 did not suffer any casualties until she was destroyed and was sunk.
The commander of the ship, Günter Ruperti, also commanded  during World War II, by which time he had been promoted to Kapitänleutnant. He commanded U-3039 from March 1945 until May 1945, taking up his post only about five months after U-777 was sunk.

References

Bibliography

 U-Boat Operations of the Second World War, Volume 2: Career Histories, U511-UIT25

External links

German Type VIIC submarines
U-boats commissioned in 1944
U-boats sunk in 1944
World War II submarines of Germany
World War II shipwrecks in the North Sea
1944 ships
Ships built in Wilhelmshaven
U-boats sunk by British aircraft
Maritime incidents in October 1944
Maritime incidents in December 1945